Colonel Bolívar Urrutia Parrilla (1 December 1918 – 2 June 2005) was a Panamanian soldier and former President of Panama along with José María Pinilla Fábrega from 1968 to 1969.

Biography

Urrutia was a Panamanian soldier who commanded, alongside José María Pinilla, the military junta which overthrew elect president Arnulfo Arias on October 11, 1968. After the coup de etat, Urrutia and Pinilla took on together the charge of President of Panama. They governed together until the military junta was replaced by a civil junta on December 16, 1969 with president Demetrio Basilio Lakas. He died on June 2, 2005 at the age of 86.

References

1918 births
2005 deaths
Presidents of Panama
People from Las Tablas, Los Santos
Leaders who took power by coup